The Straussee is a German lake located in Strausberg, Brandenburg. The town of Strausberg occupies the eastern shore of the lake, whilst the forest of the Strausberger Forest is on the western shore.

Overview
It is crossed in its middle by the Straussee Ferry, an unusual electrically propelled passenger cable ferry.

The lake is relatively rich in fish, and is popular with both anglers and commercial fishermen. It contains populations of northern pike, zander, eel, crayfish, burbot, various species of perch, and carp. Rainbow trout are bred in fish farms.

References

External links

Strausberg
Lakes of Brandenburg